Pat Booth, Lady Lowe (24 April 1943 – 11 May 2009) was an English model, photographer, and author of romantic fiction.

Biography
Raised in the East End of London by a boxer father and an ambitious mother, Booth posed for such photographers as Norman Parkinson, Allen Jones and David Bailey in the 1960s. Famously, she was the model for Allen Jones' "table", a woman on all fours bearing a plate glass tabletop on her back. She later became a photographer herself, taking pictures of such well-known figures as David Bowie and Bianca Jagger, Jean-Claude Duvalier as well as Queen Elizabeth II and the Queen Mother.

Her work has been displayed in the National Portrait Gallery and in The Sunday Times and Cosmopolitan. In the 1980s she turned her hand to writing racy and glitzy romance novels, partly inspired by her own glamorous lifestyle. She was published in both the U.S. and the UK.

She was, however, also a devout Roman Catholic and regular churchgoer. She provided assistance  to women who became pregnant, but were unable to support a child.

Booth's first husband, Garth Wood, a doctor, committed suicide in 2001. The marriage produced a son, Orlando Wood and an adopted daughter, Camellia Wood. She remarried, to Sir Frank Lowe, in 2008 in a ceremony attended by good friend Pattie Boyd.

Booth died from lung cancer in a London hospital on 11 May 2009, aged 66.

Partial bibliography
Lady and the Champ (1980)
Rags to Riches (1981)
Master Photographers: The World's Great Photographers on Their Art and Technique (1983)
Self Portrait (1983)
Sparklers (1983)
The Big Apple (1984)
Palm Beach (1985)
The Sisters (1987)
Beverly Hills (1989)
Malibu (1990)
Miami (1991)
All for Love (1993)
Marry Me (1996)
American Icon (1998)
Temptation (1998)
Nashville (2000)

References

External links
Booth's writings

1943 births
2009 deaths
English female models
English women novelists
English women photographers
English women philanthropists
English Roman Catholics
Photographers from London
20th-century English novelists
20th-century English women writers
20th-century British philanthropists
20th-century British photographers
21st-century British photographers
21st-century English novelists
21st-century Roman Catholics
20th-century Roman Catholics
Writers from London
Models from London
20th-century women photographers
21st-century women photographers
Deaths from lung cancer in England
21st-century English women
Wives of knights
20th-century women philanthropists